Aquiller was a Canadian hamlet in the Fortune Bay District of the province of Newfoundland and Labrador.

The nearest post office was in Pusthrough in 1911.

See also
List of ghost towns in Newfoundland and Labrador

Populated coastal places in Canada
Populated places in Newfoundland and Labrador